Ghevra is a census town in North West district  in the state of Delhi, India.

Demographics
 India census, Ghevra had a population of 5920. Males constitute 59% of the population and females 41%. Ghevra has an average literacy rate of 69%, higher than the national average of 59.5%: male literacy is 75%, and female literacy is 61%. In Ghevra, 13% of the population is under six years of age.

References

Cities and towns in North West Delhi district